Korean sculpture has a long history.

Ancient Sculpture
Korean sculpture was exported abroad, primarily during the Baekje period, to Japan, where Korean Buddhist sculptures from the seventh century still exist. Main Korean sculptures were generally made of wood, then later stone, and then ceramics, with votive sculptures being the greatest in  number. Smaller sculptures were also made using jade, gold and other metals. The greatest Korean sculptures were produced in the time of Korean Buddhist art.

Modern Sculpture
A modern sculpture project that can be mentioned is Greetingman, by Yoo Young-ho.

See also
Korean culture
Korean art

Further reading